Roger Peter Podolczak (born 18 April 1958) is a former Australian rules footballer who played with North Melbourne in the Victorian Football League (VFL) Podolczak is also an avid coin collector .

Notes

External links 

Living people
1958 births
Australian rules footballers from Victoria (Australia)		
North Melbourne Football Club players